The Heart of a Warrior is the third book in the Ravenpaw's Path series of original English-language manga. It focuses on Firestar's promise to get rid of the rogues that are living in Ravenpaw and Barley's barn. The book came out on 3 August 2010 and was published by Tokyopop. It was published under the pen name Erin Hunter, was written by Dan Jolley, and was drawn by James L. Barry.

Plot
In the previous book, A Clan in Need, Ravenpaw and Barley ask Firestar, leader of ThunderClan, for help to drive out the rogues that drove Ravenpaw and Barley away from their farm. After gathering up a patrol of cats willing to help, they leave to go to the farm. The cats go into the barn to find the place wrecked, and the rogues making messes. Firestar makes a plan to ambush the rogues in their sleep. When they carry out their plan, they are given away when the chickens are startled and make a lot of noise. The rogues are alarmed, and fight the Clan cats. There turns out to be a far larger amount of rogues than the Clan cats originally intended, some of whom are BloodClan refugees. During the battle in the barn, the farmer hears the cats and goes in, scaring all the cats off. ThunderClan regroups, and Firestar comes up with another plan to defeat the rogues. The plan works, and ThunderClan drives the rogues out of the barn, but right at the turning point of the battle, reinforcements for the rogues show up. The Clan cats begin to lose the fight, but the dogs of the farm get loose and attack the rogues. They finally drive out the rogues with the help of the dogs, leaving only Barley's brothers, Hoot and Jumper. Firestar and the warrior patrol then depart, and Ravenpaw and Barley go into the barn. They decide to let Hoot and Jumper stay in the barn with them. While Barley goes out on a walk, Ravenpaw shows Hoot and Jumper around the farm. Ravenpaw notices that Hoot and Jumper don't care about it. When Ravenpaw and the visitors return to the barn, Ravenpaw takes a nap. When Barley wakes him up, he finds the barn wrecked. Hoot and Jumper claim that they were trying to hunt for mice, and accidentally destroyed it. One night Barley and his brothers go out for a walk. When they return, Hoot and Jumper order Ravenpaw to hunt for them. The next day, they still are ordering Ravenpaw around. Ravenpaw wonders why Barley isn't doing anything about it. However, as if on cue, Barley gets angry at Hoot and Jumper, saying that he doesn't like how they are treating Ravenpaw, and claims that loyalty is everything, not blood. Hoot and Jumper leave the barn for good, and Ravenpaw and Barley finally have their home, back.

Publication list 
 A Heart of a Warrior (EN), HarperCollins (paperback), 3 August 2010
 Rabenpfotes Abenteuer (DE),Tokyopop (paperback), 12 May 2011
 Сердце воителя (RU), OLMA Media Group (paperback) 2012
 Med hjerte for klanen (NO), Juritzen Jr. (unknown binding), 15 June 2018
 The Heart of a Warrior (EN), HarperCollins (paperback; colored reprint), 26 June 2018

References

Warriors (novel series)
HarperCollins books
2010 American novels
2010 children's books
Novels about cats
Comics about cats
Original English-language manga